Moses Haughton was the name of an uncle and nephew who were both artists in late eighteenth and early nineteenth century England:
Moses Haughton the elder, (sometimes spelled "Horton") painter, designer and engraver who spent most of his life in Birmingham
Moses Haughton the younger, engraver best known for his work with Henry Fuseli in London